The 1924 United States presidential election in Illinois took place on November 4, 1924, as part of the 1924 United States presidential election. State voters chose 29 representatives, or electors, to the Electoral College, who voted for president and vice president.

Election information
The primaries and general elections coincided with those for other federal offices (Senate and House), as well as those for state offices.

Background
A strongly Democratic state during the Second Party System, Illinois became Republican-leaning after the American Civil War due to a combination of strong Free Soil Party heritage amongst its Yankee northern counties with the wartime conversion of some Virginian-settled rock-ribbed Democratic Southern Illinois counties to Unionist Republicanism à la Appalachia. Between the Civil War and World War I, partisanship in Illinois – like in the Border States – largely re-fought the war, with the result that although the Democratic Party gained at least 43 percent of the statewide vote via Southern and German Catholic support in every election up to 1900, they never gained an absolute majority and carried the state's electoral votes only in 1892.

Due to the Democratic Party's growing Populist and prohibitionist leanings, a decline in Democratic support after 1900 in its German Central Illinois strongholds transformed Illinois into a powerfully Republican state at all levels. Even Woodrow Wilson in 1912 when the GOP was mortally divided carried the state by only a very narrow margin, and in 1920 hostility to the League of Nations and the perceived anti-German bias of both outgoing President Wilson and new Democratic nominee and former Ohio Governor James M. Cox – the latter of whom had banned German-language instruction in Ohio schools – meant Harding carried Illinois by over 42 percentage points and the state was his sixth strongest in a national landslide. German Catholic Clinton County, and twelve southern-settled counties in the Illinois River valley and southward, went Republican for the first time.

Turnout
The total vote in the state-run primary elections (Democratic and Republican) was 1,101,583.

The total vote in the general election was 2,470,067.

Primaries
Both major parties held non-binding state-run preferential primaries on April 8.

Democratic

The 1924 Illinois Democratic presidential primary was held on April 8, 1924 in the U.S. state of Illinois as one of the Democratic Party's state primaries ahead of the 1924 presidential election.

The preference vote was a non-binding "beauty contest". Delegates were instead elected by direct votes by congressional district on delegate candidates. Delegate candidates either were listed on the ballot with their preference on for a particular presidential candidate, or were listed as expressing no preference.

The preference vote was near unanimously won by the only name on the ballot, former United States Secretary of the Treasury William Gibbs McAdoo.

Republican

The 1924 Illinois Republican presidential primary was held on April 8, 1924 in the U.S. state of Illinois as one of the Republican Party's state primaries ahead of the 1924 presidential election.

The preference vote was a "beauty contest". Delegates were instead selected by direct-vote in each congressional districts on delegate candidates. Delegate candidates either were listed on the ballot with their preference on for a particular presidential candidate, or were listed as expressing no preference.

General election
During the Republican National Convention, Illinosian Charles G. Dawes easily won the Vice-Presidential nomination ahead of fellow state resident Frank Lowden.

The first campaign in Illinois was not by Coolidge or Davis, but by radical third-party nominee, veteran Wisconsin Senator Robert M. La Follette, who on July 4 confirmed his previous plan to run a third-party campaign when nominated by the “Conference for Progressive Political Action”. La Follette on Labor Day, August 22, said he hoped to carry Illinois because he believed gubernatorial candidate Len Small would not aid the Coolidge ticket. Democratic nominee John W. Davis, a conservative Southern Democrat from West Virginia, spent four days in Chicago conferring with party leaders from half-a-dozen other states, but did not campaign downstate. Coolidge was urged to campaign in the state after suspicions La Follette would be a severe threat in Chicago and other German-American communities. Coolidge did not respond, and Dawes was viciously criticised by La Follette's running mate, Montana Senator Burton K. Wheeler, for being associated with the Central Trust Company and Lorimer Street State Savings Bank.

At the beginning of the campaign it was considered possible that Davis could carry Illinois if there was a strong enough vote for La Follette. However, as early as mid-August it was thought that the Coolidge-Dawes ticket was certain of carrying Illinois, and in mid-September it seemed likely Coolidge was a clear first with La Follette running ahead of Davis, a result that would be repeated in a survey during the second week of October.

After polls in mid-October suggested a trend toward him, Davis intended to campaign downstate, but never did so. As election day neared, it became clearer that Coolidge would carry Illinois, although at the beginning of the fourth week of October it was thought he would win by only half Harding's 1920 margin, even with La Follette abandoning his campaigns in the Corn Belt. Polls on October 29 further confirmed Illinois as in Coolidge's hands,

Ultimately Coolidge won by substantially more than the mid-October predictions, although by less than Harding had in 1920. Davis did regain seven of the thirteen counties that defected to the GOP for the first time in 1920, but still did worse than any other major party nominee in Illinois presidential election history except William Howard Taft in 1912. La Follette ran third below Davis, running far below his performance in his adjacent home state of Wisconsin and other states to the northwest, but nonetheless performed extremely well for a third party in German Catholic precincts and in industrial areas of the Upper Mississippi Valley adjacent to Iowa. The Wisconsin Senator did carry one county – German Catholic Clinton – which was the nation's southeasternmost county to vote for La Follette.

Coolidge maintained the dominance that Warren Harding had enjoyed in 1920, despite losing substantial German Catholic and Mississippi Valley industrial support to La Folette. This is the most recent presidential election in which Illinois would vote to the right of neighboring Indiana.

Results

Results by county

See also
 United States presidential elections in Illinois

Notes

References

1924 Illinois elections
Illinois
1924